This was a new event to the 2011 ITF Women's Circuit. 
Julie Coin and Eva Hrdinová won the title by defeating Sandra Klemenschits and Irena Pavlovic in the final 6–4, 7–5.

Seeds

Draw

Draw

References
 Main Draw

ITK Open - Doubles